The 2022–23 Montenegrin Cup is the 17th edition of the knockout football tournament in Montenegro. This season's cup was started on 7 September 2022. The winners of the cup this season earned a place in the first qualifying round of the 2022–23 UEFA Europa Conference League.

Budućnost is the defending champions from the previous season after defeating Dečić in the final by the score of 1–0.

Match times up to 30 October 2022 and from 26 March 2023 were CEST (UTC+2). Times on interim ("winter") days were CET (UTC+1).

First round
Draw for the first round was held on 2 September 2022. The matches were played on 7 September 2022.

Summary

|}

Matches

Quarter-finals
Draw for the quarter-finals was held on 17 October 2022. The matches were played on 26 October 2022.

Summary

|}

Matches

See also
 Montenegrin Cup
 Montenegrin First League

References

External links
Montenegrin Cup 2022-2023 at Football Association of Montenegro's official site
Montenegrin Cup 2022-2023 at Soccerway

Montenegrin Cup seasons
Montenegro
Cup